María del Carmen Machi Arroyo (born 7 January 1963) is a Spanish actress. She become popular for her role as Aída in the television series 7 vidas and Aída.

Biography 
María del Carmen Machi Arroyo was born on 7 January 1963 in Madrid and raised in neighbouring Getafe. Her father's family comes from Genoa. After several years as a theatre actress, she became popular thanks to her character Aída first in the TV series 7 Vidas, and later in a spinoff series made for the character, Aída.

She has also worked in movies like Hable con ella (2002), Descongélate (2003), Los Amantes Pasajeros (2013), Ocho apellidos vascos (2014) and Ocho apellidos catalanes (2015).

Filmography

Film

Television

References

External links

1963 births
Living people
Spanish people of Italian descent
People of Ligurian descent
Actresses from Madrid
Spanish film actresses
Spanish television actresses
Chicas Almodóvar
21st-century Spanish actresses
Spanish stage actresses